The 2011 Nigerian Senate election in Kaduna State was held on April 9, 2011, to elect members of the Nigerian Senate to represent Kaduna State. Yusuf Datti Baba-Ahmed representing Kaduna North and Mohammed Saleh representing Kaduna Central won on the platform of Congress for Progressive Change, while Nenadi Usman representing Kaduna South on the platform of Peoples Democratic Party.

Overview

Summary

Results

Kaduna North 
Congress for Progressive Change candidate Yusuf Datti Baba-Ahmed won the election, defeating other party candidates.

Kaduna Central 
Congress for Progressive Change candidate Mohammed Saleh won the election, defeating other party candidates.

Kaduna South 
Peoples Democratic Party candidate Nenadi Usman won the election, defeating party candidates.

References 

Kaduna State senatorial elections
Kaduna State senatorial elections
Kaduna State Senate elections